The Karner blue (Plebejus samuelis) is an endangered species of small blue butterfly found in some Great Lakes states, small areas of New Jersey, the Capital District region of New York, and southern New Hampshire (where it is the official state butterfly) in the United States. The butterfly, whose life cycle depends on the wild blue lupine flower (Lupinus perennis), was classified as an endangered species in the United States in 1992.

First considered a subspecies of Plebejus melissa, it was first identified and described by novelist Vladimir Nabokov. The name originates from Karner, New York (located half-way between Albany and Schenectady) in the Albany Pine Bush, where it was first discovered.
In the novel Pnin, Nabokov describes a score of Karner blues without naming them.

Lupine blooms in late May. There are two generations of Karner blues per year, the first in late May to mid June, the second from mid-July to mid-August.

Local conservation efforts, concentrating on replanting large areas of blue lupine which have been lost to development (and to fire suppression, which destroys the open, sandy habitat required by blue lupine), are having modest success at encouraging the butterfly's repopulation. The Necedah National Wildlife Refuge in central Wisconsin is home to the world's largest population of Karner blues, which benefit from its vast area of savanna and extensive lupine.

In 2003, the Canadian Species at Risk Act listed the Karner blue as being extirpated from Canada. In 2012, after an unusually hot and dry year, the Karner blue was also extirpated in the Indiana Dunes National Park.

Description
The male and female of this small (wingspan of about one inch) butterfly are different in appearance. The topside of the male is silvery or dark blue with narrow black margins. The female is grayish brown, especially on the outer portions of the wings, to blue on the topside, with irregular bands of orange crescents inside the narrow black border. The underside of both sexes is gray with a continuous band of orange crescents along the edges of both wings and with scattered black spots circled with white.

Distribution and habitat
The Karner blue butterfly occurs in portions of eastern Minnesota, Wisconsin, Michigan, and New York. Reintroductions have been initiated in Ohio, Indiana, Illinois and New Hampshire. The Karner blue butterfly appears extirpated from Iowa, Pennsylvania, Massachusetts, Maine, and Ontario in Canada.

Although Karner blue butterflies are characteristic of oak savannas (Quercus spp.) and pine barrens (Pinus spp.) habitats, they also occur in frequently disturbed areas such as rights-of-way, old fields, and road margins. In east-central New York, Karner blue butterflies occurred in 3 rights-of-way habitat types: wild lily-of-the-valley-starflower (Maianthemum canadensis-Trientalis borealis), sweetfern-whorled yellow loosestrife (Comptonia peregrina-Lysimachia quadrifolia), and blackberry-sheep sorrel (Rubus spp. Rumex acetosella). An index of Karner blue population size was highest in the wild lily-of-the-valley-starflower type. In this habitat, mosses (Bryophyta, 6.9%), wild lily-of-the-valley (4.4%), grasses (Poaceae, 4.4%), and starflower (2.1%) had the highest cover. Coverage in the sweetfern-whorled yellow loosestrife type was dominated by grasses (40.9%), sweetfern (12.1%), mosses (9.4%), and whorled yellow loosestrife (5.2%). In the blackberry-sheep sorrel type, the dominants included grasses (22.7%), northern dewberry (Rubus flagellaris, 5.0%), other blackberries (4.8%), and sheep sorrel (4.3%).

Wild lupine
Several studies have found a positive relationship between measures of wild lupine and Karner blue butterfly abundance. However, available evidence suggests that senescent wild lupine is a poor larval food source. The effects of other phenological stages are more ambiguous. In west-central Wisconsin, Karner blue butterfly abundance was negatively associated with the abundance of reproductive lupine and positively related with the frequency of immature wild lupine. However, a feeding trial found that Karner blue butterfly fed 1st year wild lupine had one of the lowest survival rates observed and significantly longer larval durations than larvae fed older wild lupine that did not flower, was flowering, had recently flowered, or was grown in shade and was in seed. In addition, on sites in Wisconsin and Minnesota, the number of 1st flight oviposition sites on nonreproductive and reproductive wild lupine was similar.

Many other factors may influence the quality of wild lupine (Lupinus perennis) as a Karner blue butterfly food resource. At Indiana Dunes National Park, wild lupine with Karner blue butterfly feeding damage had significantly larger leaves and longer and thicker stems than plants without feeding damage. In addition, larval length was positively associated with wild lupine height in central Wisconsin. Higher nitrogen concentrations in wild lupine leaves resulted in significantly shorter larval durations in a feeding trial. In 1995, in west-central Wisconsin, significantly more Karner blue butterfly larvae were observed in oak-pine barren plots where mildew infection was delayed compared to areas where wild lupine were infected earlier. However, in a feeding trial larval duration of Karner blue butterflies fed mildew-infected wild lupine was not significantly different from treatments that resulted in the shortest larval durations. Karner blue butterfly fed water-stressed wild lupine had significantly longer larval durations than many treatments including larvae fed flowering wild lupine, shade-grown wild lupine in seed, or mildew-infected wild lupine. Although Karner blue butterflies have been shown to benefit from their association with ants, wild lupine with Karner blue butterfly larvae in the Allegan State Game Area in Michigan were not detectably closer to ant hills than wild lupine without caterpillars.

Canopy cover
Due to effects of environmental variation and differing requirements among life stages, broods, and sexes, Karner blue butterflies require a mosaic of sun and shade.

Adult Karner blue butterflies' preference for open, sunny areas has been well documented. Increased lupine and nectar abundance, higher temperatures allowing for longer activity periods, and ease of finding mates have been suggested as possible reasons for adult preference of open areas.

Adult Karner blue butterfly females are more likely to use shaded habitats than males. Avoiding harassment by males and compromising between greater amounts of wild lupine in open areas and better quality of wild lupine in shaded areas (see below) have been suggested as possible reasons for increased occurrence of females in shade.

Differences between broods have also been observed. In west-central Wisconsin, abundance of spring adults positively correlated with decreasing canopy cover, while correlation with summer adults was very weak. At Indiana Dunes National Park, cover at late summer oviposition sites was significantly higher than at late spring oviposition sites. In Wisconsin and Minnesota, late spring oviposition sites occurred in partial and closed habitats significantly more than expected based on the number of nectar flowers and the cover and number of wild lupine stems, while summer oviposition sites did not differ significantly from expected. The different brood responses to shade may be due to the direct impact of varying environmental conditions over the course of the season on Karner blue butterflies (see section "Temperature") and the associated effects on wild lupine (see below).

Larvae in shaded habitat apparently have an advantage over those in open areas. The increase in larvae in shaded habitats is likely due to effects of shade on wild lupine.

Shade-grown wild lupine has been shown to provide higher quality larval resource than sun-grown lupine. Several reasons for this have been suggested. An often cited reason for the dependence of larvae, especially 2nd-brood larvae, on shaded habitat is the possibility of early senescence of wild lupine in open areas resulting in a lack of larval food. Shade-grown wild lupine being more nutritious, possibly due to nitrogen content limiting photosynthesis to a greater extent in open areas, was one of several explanations. The size of wild lupine has been positively associated with Karner blue butterfly larval length and amount of feeding damage. In addition, there may be shade-related effects on Karner blue butterflies that are related to the density of wild lupine. Wild lupine are typically more abundant in open areas than in shade. Mildew infection of wild lupine may be increased in denser wild lupine patches. Lower mildew infection rates in shadier areas have been reported. However the implications of mildew infection on Karner blue butterfly are uncertain (see section "Wild lupine"). It has also been suggested that the low density of wild lupine in shadier habitats could provide better larval habitat due to the increased search effort required by predators. This trade-off between lupine quality and quantity is another reason heterogeneous habitat is important for Karner blue butterfly.

On sites in Wisconsin and Minnesota, canopy cover did not have a significant (p>0.06) effect on total numbers of ants, parasitoids, or predators. However, certain species did show trends across canopy cover categories. For instance the ant Formica nitidiventris was only seen in open (≤15% cover) areas, while another ant, Dolichoderus plagiatus was only observed in areas with a dense canopy (≥76% cover). Parasitoids in the genera Phaeogenes and Orthostigma were all seen in closed habitats, while 90% of damsel bugs (Nabicula subcoleoptrata), a potential predator, were observed in open areas. Closed habitats had insignificantly (p=0.116) more parasitoids on average than partial (16%–75% cover) and closed habitats.

Nectar species
Nectar availability is likely to influence Karner blue butterfly abundance. In a right-of-way in west-central Wisconsin, the frequency that Karner blue butterflies stayed in an area between recaptures was significantly (p<0.05) positively related to percent cover of nectar flowers such as Canadian horseweed (Conyza canadensis var. canadensis) and spotted beebalm (Monarda punctata). Preliminary results from a study in southeastern Minnesota suggest that openings where Karner blue butterflies were detected tended to have more flowering nectar species. In Michigan, more Karner blue butterflies were observed on sites with more nectaring plants, especially butterfly milkweed (Asclepias tuberosa). As discussed in Canopy cover, nectar species increase in open habitats. For instance, at Fort McCoy in west-central Wisconsin, all the nectar species listed for Karner blue butterflies require either full or partial sun. In addition, treatments such as cutting with or without herbicides, herbicide application alone, or mowing at varying intervals resulted in a significant (p<0.01) increase in the number and cover of nectar species. See section "Food habits" for species that Karner blue butterflies use as nectar sources.

Other habitat characteristics: Although Schweitzer asserts that the presence of litter is important to Karner blue butterflies in some years, abundance in a right-of-way in west-central Wisconsin was negatively (p<0.05) related with average litter cover.

In west-central Wisconsin, the amount of Karner blue butterfly larval feeding damage increased with grass cover. A review suggests that grass cover may provide roosting sites for Karner blue butterflies and that 5% cover of tall grass would most likely meet this need.

Disturbance
Karner blue butterflies may be associated with disturbance. Although results may have been biased by a significant (p=0.009) positive correlation (r=0.2173) between patch area and number of disturbances (such as burning, vehicle traffic, and thinning and clearing), patches in a right-of-way in west-central Wisconsin occupied by Karner blue butterflies had a greater frequency of disturbance than unoccupied patches (p≤0.0125). In the same area, the abundance of the Karner blue butterfly spring brood was positively related to trails, and the percent of lupine stems with larval feeding damage was significantly (p<0.05) greater in areas disturbed by military vehicle traffic.

Temperature
Karner blue butterflies are directly affected by temperature. A laboratory investigation of temperature on Karner blue butterfly found that flight typically begins at 76 °F (24.6 °C) for females and 80 °F (26.4 °C) for males (p=0.25). Signs of heat stress started at 96 °F (35.6 °C) for females and 98 °F (36.8 °C) for males (p=0.25). In pine-oak barrens in Wisconsin, observation rates of Karner blue butterflies increased significantly (p=0.000) with increasing temperature.

The effect of temperature can influence the occurrence of Karner blue butterflies in habitats of varying canopy cover. The lower temperatures occurring in partial and shaded habitats of Wisconsin and Minnesota meant that 1st-flight females only had access to these areas for a few hours a day. In contrast, these females could access open habitats an average of 10.5 hours a day. The percent of adults in habitats of varying canopy categories was significantly (p=0.0001) influenced by temperature, with butterflies, especially females, increasing in partial (15-75%) and shaded (>75%) habitats with increasing temperature. In addition, 80% (n=45) of 1st-flight ovipositions when temperatures were cool (68-79 °F, 20-26 °C) were in sun, while only 40% (n=17) of 1st-flight ovipositions in hot temperatures (86-97 °F, 30-36 °C) occurred in the sun. The same trend was observed in 2nd-flight ovipositions. In cool temperatures 65% (n=11) of ovipositions occurred in the sun, while in hot temperatures only 40% (n=37) occurred in the sun.

Temperature also influences Karner blue butterfly phenology and brood success. Weather had strong influence on Karner blue butterfly phenology at Fort McCoy in west-central Wisconsin. In a cool year the 2nd-brood flight began 6 June, while in a warmer year adults were 1st detected on 22 May. In addition, compared to the previous year the flight of the 2nd-brood during the hot year was shortened by 20 days. At Indiana Dunes National Park, evidence suggests that cool winters negatively impact 1st-brood populations and cool summers positively affect 2nd-brood populations. A review suggests that the cover provided by snowpack protects Karner blue butterfly eggs from hatching prematurely or being overheated by direct sunlight. Therefore, short periods of continuous snow cover due to site conditions or mild winters could result in decreased occurrence or smaller populations of Karner blue butterflies.<ref name=r10>{{cite book|last1=Dirig|first1=Robert|editor1-last=Andow|editor1-first=David A. |editor2=Richard J. Baker |editor3=Cynthia P. Lane|title=Karner blue butterfly: a symbol of a vanishing landscape. Miscellaneous Publication 84-1994|date=1994|publisher=University of Minnesota, Minnesota Agricultural Experiment Station|location=St. Paul, MN|pages=23–36|chapter=Historical notes of wild lupine and the Karner blue butterfly at the Albany Pine Bush, New York}}</ref>

Landscape effects
Karner blue butterflies are dependent on heterogeneous habitat as it provides the varied requirements of different Karner blue butterfly broods, sexes, and life stages over a wide range of environmental conditions. Research at Indiana Dunes National Park led to recommendations for canopy openings for adult males and nectaring of both sexes, as well as areas with 30-60% cover for ovipositing females. In the Allegan State Game Area, wild lupine patches occupied by Karner blue butterflies had higher density of edge habitats that unoccupied wild lupine patches. In west-central Wisconsin the importance of shaded habitat led to a recommendation that 20% to 40% of Karner blue butterfly habitat provide shaded lupine and that 1/3 have >60% canopy cover with succession in these dense areas allowed to progress to complete closure. Maxwell also suggests avoiding any management that would result in habitat homogenization. The Karner blue butterfly recovery team mentions the importance of a wide range of aspects, hydrology, microtopography as well canopy cover (0-90%) in conserving the Karner blue butterfly. However, Karner blue populations can persist in relatively homogenous habitats. For instance, a population has persisted at the Saratoga Airport in New York in open habitat maintained by regular mowing. More information on the habitat characteristics, environmental conditions, and/or geographic variability in habitat requirements that facilitate Karner blue butterfly's persistence in these areas is needed.

Size of habitat patches can also influence Karner blue butterfly abundance (see section "Wild lupine"). At the Allegan State Game Area, wild lupine patches occupied by Karner blue butterflies were larger than unoccupied patches. This was also the case at Fort McCoy in Wisconsin. In addition to the effect of amount of wild lupine, a review suggests that it is easier to maintain Karner blue butterfly habitat in larger patches. Lane notes the need to find a balance between having patches of different required habitats within the activity range of Karner blue butterflies and having open areas large enough that they do not become shaded too quickly. Canopy openings with diameters of at least 82 feet (25 m) were recommended based on research at Indiana Dunes National Park, and research in Wisconsin and Minnesota led to a recommended opening size of 1.5 times the height of adjacent trees. According to a review, subpopulations in habitat patches of less than 0.25 ha (0.62 acres) are vulnerable to extirpation.

Dispersal
Given their typically short dispersal distance, the spatial arrangement of habitat is important to the conservation of the Karner blue butterfly. Distance between the various types of habitat required by Karner blue butterflies is likely an influential landscape attribute. Lane suggests that suitable Karner blue butterfly habitat occurs in areas where open and closed canopies occur within a 590-foot (180 m) diameter. Maxwell recommends considering the amount of shaded wild lupine habitat within the dispersal distance of Karner blue butterfly when reducing overstory. Many investigators stress the importance of habitat patches being closely spaced. For instance, at sites in west-central Wisconsin, the average distance from an occupied wild lupine patch to another occupied patch was significantly (p=0.002) shorter (709 feet, 216 m) than to an unoccupied patch (1,155 feet, 352 m). Wild lupine patches in the same area that were occupied by Karner blue butterflies were also surrounded by a relatively low percentage of unoccupied patches. In addition, wild lupine patches in the Allegan State Game Area that were occupied by Karner blue butterflies were closer to other occupied patches than wild lupine patches without Karner blue butterflies. This led to the recommendation that habitat patches be within 230 feet (70 m) of each other. Isolation of habitat patches has been suggested as a reason for lack of Karner blue butterfly presence on sites in New York. In addition, studies of Karner blue butterfly dispersal have led to recommended distance between patches of ≤980 feet (300 m) to allow for dispersal and management units no wider than 1,300 to 1,600 feet (400–500 m) to improve recolonization of treated areas.

The presence of dispersal corridors may assist with Karner blue butterfly dispersal. Karner blue butterflies appear to disperse further in open habitats (see section "Timing of major life history events"). However, there is uncertainty regarding what constitutes a corridor or a barrier to dispersal. Creation of corridors with both lupine for larvae and nectar species for adults may be useful in connecting habitat patches.

Life history and reproduction
Karner blue butterflies have two broods per year, following wild lupine (Lupinus perennis) phenology quite closely. Eggs laid by Karner blue butterflies in late summer overwinter and hatch in mid- to late April. Development from egg through four larval instars and pupation takes from 25 to 60 days. The average lifespan of adult Karner blue butterflies has been reported at between 3 and 5 days. The first Karner blue butterfly flight generally occurs sometime between mid-May and mid-June, with males typically appearing earlier than females. First flight females lay the vast majority of their eggs on wild lupine. These eggs develop into the adults of the second Karner blue butterfly flight, which generally occurs in July and August. Although always near a wild lupine plant, second brood females lay more eggs on grasses, other plants, and litter than 1st brood females. The 2nd flight is typically two to four times the size of the first flight. However, the first flight of Karner blue butterflies can be larger than the second. Timing and size of both flights can exhibit substantial variation, depending on local weather conditions among other factors.

A wide range of values related to Karner blue butterfly recruitment have been reported. Adult Karner blue sex ratios vary from 1 male to 1.44 females to 2 males to 1 female. Wild caught Karner blue butterfly females have been observed to lay from 7.7 to 83 eggs on average. Reported percentages of eggs that reach adulthood under controlled conditions vary from 21.4% to 75.2%. In the wild, loss of eggs may be substantial.

Karner blue butterflies do not typically move very far, with males usually moving further than females, with most studies showing average distances moved by individual butterflies of well under .

Ecology

Food habits
Wild lupine is the sole larval food source of the Karner blue butterfly. Adult Karner blue butterflies obtain nectar from several native and nonnative species. Karner blue butterflies have been reported feeding on the nectar of 41 different species in a single study in west-central Wisconsin. Broods differ significantly in the species used for nectaring, likely due to differences in their phenology. Several blackberries have been documented as food sources for the spring brood, while spotted beebalm, white sweetclover (Melilotus alba), and flowering spurge (Euphorbia corollata), are widely cited sources of nectar in the summer. Common cinquefoil (Potentilla simplex) is used as a nectar species for both broods. Karner blue butterflies' preferred nectar species may include butterfly weed in New York and Michigan and lyrate rockcress (Arabis lyrata), lanceleaf tickseed (Coreopsis lanceolata), white sweetclover, and northern dewberry (Rubus flagellaris) at Indiana Dunes National Park. Differences in nectar species used between male and female Karner blue butterflies and across locations have been reported. Other often mentioned nectar sources include New Jersey tea (Ceanothus americanus), wild lupine, goldenrods (Solidago spp.), and spotted knapweed (Centaurea maculosa).

Predators
Spiders and many insects are the major predators of Karner blue butterflies. The seven-spotted lady beetle is one of the few confirmed predators of Karner blue butterfly larvae. Paper wasps (Polistes spp.), spined soldier bugs, and ants (Formica spp.) have been observed removing larvae, and the ant Monomorium emarginatum has been seen chewing on Karner blue butterfly eggs. There is currently no explanation for the removal of larvae or chewing of eggs by some of the same ant species that tend larvae. Other potential predators of Karner blue butterfly larvae include green lacewings, soldier beetles, and damsel bugs. Predators of adult Karner blue butterflies include dragonflies, robber flies, ambush bugs (Phymatidae) and spiders, such as crab spiders. Assassin bugs (Reduviidae) are also likely predators of adult Karner blue butterflies.

Other likely predators include white-tailed deer and birds. Incidental predation of Karner blue butterfly eggs, larvae, and pupae by white-tailed deer grazing on wild lupine can be substantial.

Wasps are the most commonly reported parasitoids of Karner blue butterflies. A tachinid fly, Aplomya theclarum, has also been listed as a Karner blue butterfly parasite. Two wasps, one from the family Trichogrammatidae and another tentatively identified as a member of the family Eulophidae, are suspected to parasitize Karner blue butterfly eggs.

 Mutualism with ants 
Karner blue butterfly larvae benefit from a facultative, mutualistic relationship with several ant species. In pitch pine-bear oak (Pinus rigida-Quercus ilicifolia'') habitat in New York, significantly more larvae tended by ants survived (67%) than untended larvae (38%). The 19 ant species tending Karner blue butterfly larvae were from the subfamilies Formicinae, Myrmicinae, and Dolichoderinae, which are the most common in the area. The species of ant is likely to influence the degree of benefit gained by Karner blue butterfly larvae. At sites in Wisconsin and Minnesota, ant tending rates increased significantly with increasing larval age. The Karner blue larvae also has fine hairs on it to protect itself. In a study of the effect of different experimental feeding treatments, Karner blue butterfly larvae tended by ants had one of the shortest observed larval durations and gained the most weight for the amount of lupine eaten.

Management considerations 

According to reviews, habitat loss through direct conversion to other land uses and through succession are considered the major causes of the decline of the Karner blue butterfly. At the time of this writing (2006), two reviews summarize the recent status of Karner blue butterfly across its range. Recovery criteria are addressed by, while Christenson and Lentz discuss lessons learned developing a statewide Habitat Conservation Plan for Wisconsin.

Articles that address Karner blue butterfly sampling methodology include. Swengel found that surveys for Karner blue butterfly adults appeared more efficient than those for larvae. Evidence of different catchability and/or detectability of male and female Karner blue butterflies led King to suggest calculating male and female population sizes separately. General descriptions of Karner blue butterfly rearing methods and translocation/ reintroduction techniques are available.

A wide variety of management techniques can be compatible with maintaining Karner blue butterfly populations when attention is paid to implementing them at appropriate times and at intensities, scales, and frequencies that Karner blue butterflies can tolerate. For example, mowing can maintain open areas with little to no detrimental effect on Karner blue butterflies on sites where burning is impractical or in areas too small to support populations of Karner blue butterflies likely to survive a burn. On restored oak savanna sites in south-central Wisconsin, no significant (p=0.924) differences were detected between Karner blue butterfly densities on sites burned in summer, sites mowed in August, and control sites. Mowing with a blade height >4 inches (10 cm) should be performed annually or biennially in the fall or winter and clippings should be left in place. Effects of mowing, burning, and other management techniques and land uses on the average number of Karner blue butterflies observed per survey hour are included in. Recommendations on the use of a wide range of management techniques such as thinning, rotational grazing, and planting of wild lupine and/or nectar species can be found in.

According to reviews and general field observations, management activities that are typically harmful to Karner blue butterflies include management that increases deer and/or grouse populations, close-cropped grazing, frequent or poorly-timed mowing, plowing, use of herbicides that kill lupine or nectar plants, and use of pesticides that are detrimental to Karner blue butterflies, ants they associate with, or pollinators of species they use for nectar. Information on the impacts of an insecticide on Karner blue butterflies and some herbicides on Karner blue butterflies as well as lupine and nectar species are available. According to the Karner blue butterfly recovery plan, management activities that can have a detrimental effect should be timed to allow at least 2 generations between repeat treatments and, if possible, critical subpopulations should be divided into discrete management units.

Nectar
Given the wide range of nectar species used by Karner blue butterfly (see section "Food habits"), planting several often used or preferred nectar species is favored over selecting 1 or 2 specific species. Species selection should attempt to provide nectar sources in both open and partially shaded conditions throughout the growing season despite yearly variation in environmental conditions. Planting nonnative nectar sources is discouraged due to their potential impacts on native food sources, especially wild lupine.

Heterogeneity
Heterogeneity is an important feature of Karner blue butterfly habitat. Specific recommendations regarding the spatial arrangement of the various required habitat types and Karner blue butterfly habitat patches are discussed in Landscape effects. Creation and rotation of management units should incorporate this information as well as data on Karner blue butterfly movement (see section "Timing of major life history events"). Bidwell recommends management units be a maximum of 1,300 to 1,600 feet (400–500 m) wide to improve recolonization from neighboring areas. Depending on the available and surrounding habitat, managing for heterogeneity could mean implementing a wide range of techniques.

References

External links
U.S. Fish and Wildlife Service (Midwest Region) Karner blue butterfly page
NY DEC article on the Karner blue
Karner blue butterfly (Lycaeides melissa samuelis)
Karner blue butterfly This site from the Wisconsin Department of Natural Resources contains conservation information, identification tips, plant species that attract and nurture Karner blues, and much more.
Rhapsody In Blue The Karner blue butterfly makes a comeback
The Return of The Karner Blue in Ohio

Plebejus
Endangered fauna of the United States
Butterflies of North America
ESA endangered species